Ghost of the Mountains is a 2017 American nature documentary film about snow leopards on the Tibetan Plateau. Directed and written by Ben Wallis and narrated by Antoine Fuqua, Ghost of the Mountains was released theatrically by Disneynature on June 30, 2017, the eleventh nature documentary released under that label.

Much of the work depended on local Tibetans, their vast knowledge of the environment, and their sincere hospitality. It was filmed in Yulshul, Kham.

References

External links
 

2017 films
2017 documentary films
American documentary films
Disneynature films
Documentary films about cats
2010s English-language films
2010s American films